W15CG Channel 15 TV was a translator television station located in Pontotoc, Mississippi. The station was owned and operated by the Unity Broadcasting Network.

W15CG's license was cancelled by the Federal Communications Commission on July 22, 2021, as the station failed to converted to digital operations by the July 13, 2021 deadline.

Coverage areas
Pontotoc, Mississippi
Algoma, Mississippi
Ecru, Mississippi
Thaxton, Mississippi
Sherman, Mississippi
New Houlka, Mississippi
Tupelo, Mississippi
Verona, Mississippi

References

15CG
Television channels and stations established in 2005
2005 establishments in Mississippi
Defunct television stations in the United States
Television channels and stations disestablished in 2021
2021 disestablishments in Mississippi
15CG